Conrad Stephen Ortmayer (February 13, 1944 – March 9, 2021) was an American football player, coach, and executive who served as the general manager of the National Football League (NFL)'s San Diego Chargers and St. Louis Rams.

Early life and playing career
Born in Painesville, Ohio, Ortmayer grew up in Nashville, Tennessee, and Dallas, Texas. He played one season at Vanderbilt University before transferring to the University of La Verne and playing three seasons there.

Coaching career
Ortmayer got his start in coaching at the University of Colorado at Boulder in 1967 and also spent a season at Georgia Tech. From 1968 to 1973, he was assistant head coach, offensive line coach, and defensive line coach for Colorado. In 1974, he was assistant head coach and offensive line coach for the Georgia Tech Yellow Jackets. After one year with the Yellow Jackets, Ortmayer moved on to the National Football League (NFL) to be the special teams coach of the Kansas City Chiefs from 1975 to 1977.  Ortmayer spent 25 seasons in the NFL and won two Super Bowl rings as special teams coach with the Oakland/Los Angeles Raiders.  In 2003, he became assistant head coach, special teams coordinator, and tight ends coach at the University of Kentucky.  Ortmayer has coached in five college bowl games and for eight NFL playoff teams, in addition to his two Super Bowl wins with the Raiders.

Executive career
In 1987, Ortmayer moved to the San Diego Chargers as general manager where he served until his release in December 1989. He then rejoined the Raiders until moving to an administrative office with the Los Angeles Rams. With the Raiders, he served in a number of capacities ranging from assistant coach to Director of Football Operations. Ortmayer was on the sidelines when the Raiders won both Super Bowl XV and Super Bowl XVIII. In 1995, as Vice President of Football Operations of the Rams, Ortmayer oversaw the move from Los Angeles to St. Louis. In 2000, Ortmayer was named Director of Player Personnel of the XFL's Memphis Maniax.

References

1944 births
2021 deaths
Colorado Buffaloes football coaches
Georgia Tech Yellow Jackets football coaches
Kansas City Chiefs coaches
Kentucky Wildcats football coaches
La Verne Leopards football players
Los Angeles Raiders coaches
National Football League general managers
Oakland Raiders coaches
San Diego Chargers executives
St. Louis Rams executives
Vanderbilt Commodores football players
People from Painesville, Ohio
Players of American football from Dallas
Players of American football from Nashville, Tennessee